The women's singles of the 2021 I.ČLTK Prague Open tournament was played on clay in Prague, Czech Republic.

Tamara Korpatsch was the defending champion, but chose not to participate.

Jule Niemeier won the title, starting from qualifications, defeating Dalma Gálfi in the final, 6–4, 6–2.

Seeds

Draw

Finals

Top half

Bottom half

References

External Links
Main Draw on ITF website

I.ČLTK Prague Open - Singles
I.ČLTK Prague Open